Abraham Busschop or Abraham Bisschop (1670, Dordrecht – 1729, Middelburg), was an 18th-century painter from the Northern Netherlands.

Biography

According to Houbraken he was the son of the Cornelis Bisschop and the brother of Jacobus.

According to the RKD he became a member of the Middelburg Guild of St. Luke in 1715. He is known for still lifes and bird and animal pieces.

References

Notes
Ceiling piece in the Dordrecht Museum
Abraham Busschop on Artnet

1670 births
1729 deaths
18th-century Dutch painters
18th-century Dutch male artists
Dutch male painters
Artists from Dordrecht
Dutch bird artists
Dutch still life painters
Painters from Middelburg